Melvin Spears (born January 16, 1960) is a former American football coach. He served as the head football coach at Grambling State University from 2004 to 2006 and Alcorn State University in 2011, compiling a career college football coaching record of 22–22. Spears was a coach at Texas Southern University, working with the wide receivers in 2008 then moving over to running backs the following year. He served as the offensive coordinator of Alabama State University during the 2010 season. Spears was selected on January 19, 2011, to the post of head coach of his alma mater, Alcorn State. Spears was fired by Alcorn State on February 24, 2012. He had previously been placed on administrative leave.

Head coaching record

References

1960 births
Living people
American football quarterbacks
American football wide receivers
Alabama State Hornets football coaches
Alcorn State Braves football coaches
Grambling State Tigers football coaches
Morgan State Bears football coaches
Texas Southern Tigers football coaches
High school football coaches in Arizona
People from Clinton, Louisiana
Coaches of American football from Louisiana
Players of American football from Louisiana
African-American coaches of American football
African-American players of American football
20th-century African-American sportspeople
21st-century African-American sportspeople